Buon Ma Thuot Airport  is a public airport in Vietnam. The airport is located near the provincial capital Buon Ma Thuot in Đắk Lắk Province. Another name for this airport is Phung-Duc Airport. It has one functional runway. A second incomplete runway (marked with a faded 27 R) is not in use. Two aprons are located on the south side of the airport with buildings that appeared to be used for aircraft storage. A barracks-like camp is located to the north side of the airport. This airport handled 860,000 passenger in 2016.

Airlines and destinations

See also 

 List of airports in Vietnam

References
Buôn Ma Thuột at World Aero Data

Buon Ma Thuot
Airports in Vietnam
Buildings and structures in Đắk Lắk province